Ijaz Ahmed is a British professional boxer who challenged for the British super-flyweight title in 2021.

Professional career
Ahmed made his professional debut on 11 November 2017, scoring a four-round points decision (PTS) victory against Craig Derbyshire at The Venue in Edgbaston.

After compiling a record of 4–1 (0 KOs), he defeated Conar Blackshaw via PTS over ten rounds, capturing the vacant Midlands Area flyweight title on 9 December 2018 at the Holiday Inn in Birmingham.

Following two more wins, he faced Harvey Horn for the vacant WBO European flyweight title on 18 November 2018 at the London Hilton on Park Lane. Scheduled for ten rounds, Ahmed suffered the second defeat of his career, losing via unanimous decision (UD).

In his next fight he moved up a weight class, challenging reigning champion Kaisy Khademi for his WBO European super-flyweight title, with the vacant IBF European title also on the line. Taking place on 27 February 2021 at the Copper Box Arena in London, Ahmed emerged victorious, defeating Khademi via ten-round majority decision (MD). Two judges scored the bout 96–94 and 96–95 in favour of Ahmed, while the third judge scored it a draw at 95–95.

The pair had an immediate rematch on 28 August at the Utilita Arena, with the vacant British super-flyweight title on the line. After the twelve rounds were complete the bout ended in a split draw with the judges' scorecards reading 115–113 for Ahmed, 115–114 for Khademi and 115–115, leaving the British title vacant.

Professional boxing record

References

External links

Living people
Year of birth missing (living people)
Date of birth missing (living people)
Boxers from Birmingham, West Midlands
British male boxers
Flyweight boxers
Super-flyweight boxers